Saint Johns Creek may refer to:

Saint Johns Creek (Missouri)
Saint Johns Creek (Pennsylvania)